Surridge is a surname, Notable people with the surname include:

Arthur Surridge, Australian rugby league footballer
Arthur Surridge Hunt, English papyrologist
Steve Surridge, New Zealand rugby union footballer
Stuart Surridge, English cricketer
Victor Surridge, English motor-cycle racer

See also
Surridge Sports, a sportswear company